is a Japanese Shinto shrine in Higashinada ward, Kobe. It is one of the biggest shrines in western Kobe. It is next to Sumiyoshi Station. There is documentary evidence that the shrine has existed since the 13th century.

Moto-Sumiyoshi Shrine holds a danjiri festival annually in May. Portable shrines are wheeled through neighborhoods around the shrine by teams of about 50 people.

Controversy 
It is insisted by the Shrine in its "Chronicle of Moto-Sumiyoshi Shrine" (2000), based on Kojiki-den written  by Motoori Norinaga, that the head of  Sumiyoshi Shrine originally moved from this Shrine to Sumiyoshi Taisha because Moto-Sumiyoshi Shrine has "Moto-" which means "the Head".

References

Shinto shrines in Hyōgo Prefecture